The Tukh Manuk Shrine of Oshakan is located in the town of Oshakan in Aragatsotn Marz, Armenia. Tukh Manuk literally translates to "dark baby" or "dark-skinned youth."

References

External links
 About the Tukh Manuk Cult

Tourist attractions in Aragatsotn Province
Buildings and structures in Aragatsotn Province
Religious buildings and structures in Armenia